Condamine Farms is a rural locality in the Toowoomba Region, Queensland, Australia.

Geography 
The land is mostly undeveloped. The predominant land use is grazing with some cropping.

History 
The locality was named for being in the vicinity of the Condamine River, although the river flows approx  to the north-east of the locality.

Education 
There are no schools in Condamine Farms. The nearest primary and secondary school to Year 10 is in Millmerran and the nearest secondary school to Year 12 in is Pittsworth.

References 

Toowoomba Region
Localities in Queensland